Hans Erik "Trisse" Nilsson (7 November 1941 — ) is a Swedish former footballer and bandy player.

Playing career

Club
Nilsson played for IFK Stockholm, Djurgårdens IF, IK Sirius, IF Brommapojkarna and Vallentuna BK. He won the Allsvenskan in 1964.

International
Nilsson made one match for Sweden national football team, the UEFA Euro 1972 qualifying 0–3 loss against Italy national football team.

He also made 4 Sweden U23 team matches (1 goal) and 5 Sweden B team matches (3 goals).

Honours

Club 

 Djurgårdens IF 
 Allsvenskan: 1964

 IK Sirius
 Division 3 Östra Svealand (1): 1966
 Division 2 Svealand (1): 1968

References

Swedish footballers
1941 births
Allsvenskan players
IFK Stockholm players
Djurgårdens IF Fotboll players
IK Sirius Fotboll players
IF Brommapojkarna players
Living people
Swedish bandy players
Association football midfielders
Sweden international footballers